Old State Bank may refer to:

 Old State Bank (Decatur, Alabama), Decatur, Alabama
 Old State Bank (Vincennes, Indiana), Vincennes, Indiana

See also
 Old Bunnell State Bank Building, Bunnell, Florida